Bellman and True is a 1987 film based on the novel of the same name by Desmond Lowden. The film was written and directed by Richard Loncraine. It stars Bernard Hill, Derek Newark and Richard Hope.

The title comes from an old Cumberland song titled "D’ye Ken John Peel", specifically the lyric:
Yes, I ken John Peel and Ruby too.
Ranter and Ringwood, Bellman and True.
From a find to a check, from a check to a view,
From a view to a death in the morning.

The title uses a pun in the term Bellman which in the film's case refers to a criminal who specialises in disabling intruder alarm systems.

Plot
Hiller (Hill) arrives at Paddington station in London with a boy (O'Brien) following a stay in Torquay. They do not realise they are being tailed by Gort (Bones) as they check into a nearby hotel. A few days later, the child is kidnapped by Gort and Hiller is also captured: both are taken to a derelict house where he encounters Salto (Hope). It transpires that Hiller is a computer programmer who Salto had bribed to obtain details of the security system at a bank near Heathrow Airport. Salto is angry because he asked for documents and Hiller only sent him a computer tape he cannot decipher. After disappointing Salto, Hiller went into hiding with the boy and lost his job. The boy is Hiller's wife's son. When he returns to his house, he discovers that the boy's mother has left him.

Hiller and The Boy are kept captive while Hiller is forced by threats of violence to decode the tape. When he succeeds, Salto has the information he needs to rob the bank. Salto obtains finance for the robbery and recruits The Guv’nor (Newark) to mastermind it. The Bellman (Howell) identifies that the bank alarm system is sophisticated and has anti-interference safeguards. Hiller explains how to beat them and is recruited as the new Bellman. The gang decide to act just before Christmas when the bank will hold more cash than usual.

On the night of the robbery, the gang intentionally trigger the alarm. The guards, finding nothing, assume the call is false whilst the gang actually use a small window of time to enter the bank, allowing The Peterman (Whybrow) to determine how to access the basement vault area. Knowing that after the fourth callout, the guards will remain in the bank with the alarm disabled until the following morning, the gang remain in the basement.

They use a thermic lance to cut through the vault door and steal £13 million. They then release tear gas to disorientate the guards and escape in a getaway car driven by The Wheelman (Dowdall). At a changeover point, they switch from the car to a van. On the journey to an unspecified location, they hear that the security guard dog handler has died. The Guv'nor is frightened that he has broken a criminal code of conduct that no one gets hurt and is afraid that the identity of the gang will be made known to the police. He changes his plans and the gang travel to the beach next to Dungeness power station. Salto later arrives with the boy.

At the beach, The Guv’nor informs Hiller that the boy and others will go abroad in a private plane while Hiller will stay in the United Kingdom to have plastic surgery. The Guv’nor actually intends to kill Hiller but, before he can do so, Hiller steals a gun and runs into a nearby building where he earlier created an Improvised Explosive Device using a propane gas cylinder. This explodes after he has escaped, killing the Guv’nor and the others while Hiller escapes in the van, with Salto driving. They make it to the plane pick-up point, but Salto was wounded after he was shot following the explosion and dies in a pillbox.

The plane sent to pick them up does not land and Hiller and the boy drive to Heathrow Airport. They use the false passports intended for their getaway and arrive for a flight to Rio de Janeiro already booked for them. On the plane, Hiller is tense and thinks he is will be arrested when policemen come aboard the flight. It transpires that the plane is transporting human organs. The film ends with the plane taking off.

Cast 
The film gives very little clue to the complete identity of the characters. Very few names are used and the characters are referred to by either their first name or surname only or by an alternative term. Terms such as the Guv’nor (boss), Bellman (alarm disabler), Peterman (safebreaker) and Wheelman (getaway driver) are used to hide the identity of the characters.

First billed cast:
 Bernard Hill as Hiller
 Derek Newark as Guv'nor
 Richard Hope as Salto
 Ken Bones as Gort
 Frances Tomelty as Anna
 Kieran O'Brien as The Boy
 John Kavanagh as Donkey
 Arthur Whybrow as The Peterman
 Jim Dowdall as The Wheelman
 Peter Howell as The Bellman
 Kate McEnery as Mo
 Anne Carroll as Pauline
 Richard Strange as Man with Walkman
 Peter Jonfield as Security Sergeant
 Andrew Paul as Young Security Guard

Production 
Filming took place mostly in locations in London. The opening scenes were filmed in and around Paddington Station and the hotel where Hiller stays is near Praed Street. The scene where Hiller is being chased was filmed in Bayswater with Redan Place and the then closed Whiteleys department store visible in shots. The scene where the Guv’nor threatens Hiller by the side of the motorway was filmed on the M25 between junctions 14 and 15 next to the Colnbrook bypass overbridge. The scenes following the robbery were filmed at Dungeness Beach next to Dungeness Power Station. The closing scenes were filmed in Terminal 4 of Heathrow Airport.

The film was produced jointly by HandMade Films and Euston Films, the drama making subsidiary of Thames Television. The production was originally a three part series made for television with an approximate runtime of 150 minutes. The film version has been edited to 112 minutes.

Home media release 
The 112 minute film version is available on DVD. In 2019 Indicator released a Blu-ray consisting of both the original theatrical cut and an extended version that, at 122 minutes, runs around eight minutes longer.

References

External links
 
 
 
 

1987 films
1980s crime thriller films
1980s heist films
British crime thriller films
British heist films
Films based on British novels
Films directed by Richard Loncraine
Films scored by Colin Towns
1980s English-language films
1980s British films